Christ the King Catholic High School is a private, college-prep, Roman Catholic high school in Huntersville, North Carolina, United States. It operates under the direction of the Roman Catholic Diocese of Charlotte.

Background
Christ the King was founded in 2011. The mascot is the Crusader.

Athletics
Christ the King has participated in many different sports since 2011. In 2018, the Crusader swim team won the 1A/2A NCISAA state championships in dominating fashion on both the Women's and Men's side of the sport.

History
In December 2018, the school held the ribbon cutting for a brand new addition to the original school building, which houses more classrooms and a cafeteria for students.

See also

List of high schools in North Carolina
National Catholic Educational Association

Notes and references

External links
Roman Catholic Diocese of Charlotte

Catholic secondary schools in North Carolina
Schools in Mecklenburg County, North Carolina
Educational institutions established in 2011
2011 establishments in North Carolina